Glasgow Kelvin is a constituency of the Scottish Parliament (Holyrood), being one of eight constituencies within the Glasgow City council area. It elects one Member of the Scottish Parliament (MSP) by the plurality (first past the post) method of election. It is also one of nine constituencies in the Glasgow electoral region, which elects seven additional members, in addition to nine constituency MSPs, to produce a form of proportional representation for the region as a whole.

The seat has been held by Kaukab Stewart of the Scottish National Party since the 2021 Scottish Parliament election.

Electoral region 

The other eight constituencies of the Glasgow region are Glasgow Anniesland, Glasgow Cathcart, Glasgow Maryhill and Springburn, Glasgow Pollok, Glasgow Provan, Glasgow Shettleston, Glasgow Southside and Rutherglen.

The region covers the Glasgow City council area and a north-western portion of the South Lanarkshire council area.

Constituency boundaries  

The original Glasgow Kelvin constituency was created at the same time as the Scottish Parliament, in 1999, with the name and boundaries of an  existing Westminster constituency. In 2005, however, Scottish Westminster (House of Commons) constituencies were mostly replaced with new constituencies.

Boundary review

Following its First Periodic review into Scottish Parliament constituencies, a newly shaped Kelvin was formed in time for the 2011 Scottish Parliament election. The Glasgow City Council electoral wards used in the creation of the new Glasgow Kelvin seat are:

In full: Anderston/City, Hillhead
In part: Canal, Partick West

Constituency profile 
Glasgow city centre is in this constituency, including Kelvingrove Art Gallery, the cathedral, and the SEC Centre. All three of Glasgow's universities are here as well, making it reputedly the most educated constituency in Scotland; the large student population is an important factor in elections. It is also home to the Merchant City: described as 'yuppie housing', it was built out of the disused cotton and tobacco warehouses. This area is a symbol of the rebirth of the city, and Kelvin is arguably the most affluent constituency in Glasgow, although it also includes more deprived areas.

History 

The predecessor to the Westminster constituency seat, Glasgow Hillhead, was the last Conservative seat in the city until Roy Jenkins won it for the Social Democratic Party at a by-election in 1982. He held it in 1983 general election but it was taken by Labour's George Galloway in 1987.

Member of the Scottish Parliament

Election results

Elections in the 2020s

Elections in the 2010s
In 2016 the Scottish Greens overtook Scottish Labour to take second place in the Glasgow Kelvin constituency on the constituency element of the vote. This was their best ever first past the post election result, with party co-convenor Patrick Harvie finishing behind the SNP's Sandra White by 14.2% of the vote.

Elections in the 2000s

Elections in the 1990s

See also
 Politics of Glasgow

Notes

External links

Constituencies of the Scottish Parliament
Politics of Glasgow
1999 establishments in Scotland
Constituencies established in 1999
Scottish Parliament constituencies and regions 1999–2011
Scottish Parliament constituencies and regions from 2011
Partick
Hillhead